The Best of Crash Test Dummies is a 2007 compilation album by the Crash Test Dummies. It is released by Sony BMG and it includes songs from both the band's BMG and independent releases. The re-release carries a slightly different title of, "Best Of Crash Test Dummies - Collections".

Track listing

Reception

AllMusic writer James Christopher Monger states that "Best of Crash Test Dummies touches on all of (the band's) albums, grabbing the strongest cuts (many of which were initially buried amongst more cringe-inducing moments) and bringing them front and center. Songs like Unforgiven Ones, Ghosts That Haunt Me, the still heartbreaking Superman Song and even the one-off cover of XTC's Ballad of Peter Pumpkinhead (recorded when the original was only a year old), and the oddball faux-neo-soul of Keep a Lid on Things are oddly infectious, though just as divisive now as they were in their heyday."

References 

2007 greatest hits albums
Crash Test Dummies compilation albums
Sony Music compilation albums
Sony BMG compilation albums
Arista Records compilation albums